Stopover in Orly (French: Escale à Orly, German: Zwischenlandung in Paris) is a 1955 French-West German romantic comedy crime film directed by Jean Dréville and starring Dany Robin, Dieter Borsche, Simone Renant and Heinz Rühmann. It was shot at the Bendestorf Studios near Hamburg and the Victorine Studios in Nice. The film's sets were designed by the art director Robert Giordani. Location shooting took place at Orly Airport, then the main airport for Paris.

Synopsis
Michèle, an employee at the airport, is in love with American pilot Eddie Miller who regularly flies the route from New York to Paris, but problems arise when he is transferred to the Tokyo route. Meanwhile Michèle's uncle Albert who works in the freight department sets out to tackle a drug trafficking outfit.

Cast

References

Bibliography 
 Bergfelder, Tim. International Adventures: German Popular Cinema and European Co-Productions in the 1960s. Berghahn Books, 2005.
 Körner, Torsten. Ein guter Freund: Heinz Rühmann. Biographie. Aufbau Digital, 2019.

External links 
 

1955 films
1955 crime films
French crime comedy films
German crime comedy films
1955 comedy films
1950s crime comedy films
French-language German films
West German films
1950s French-language films
Films directed by Jean Dréville
Films set in Paris
Films shot in Paris
Films shot at Victorine Studios
Films based on German novels
French black-and-white films
German black-and-white films
1950s French films
1950s German films